Simandu was an archdiocese of the Syriac Orthodox Church in Cappadocia, attested between the tenth and twelfth centuries.  Thirteen of its bishops are mentioned in the lists of Michael the Syriac and other Jacobite sources.

Sources 
The main primary source for the Syriac Orthodox metropolitans of Simandu is the record of episcopal consecrations appended to Volume III of the Chronicle of the Syriac Orthodox patriarch Michael the Syrian (1166–99).  In this Appendix Michael listed most of the bishops consecrated by the Syriac Orthodox patriarchs of Antioch between the ninth and twelfth centuries.  Twenty-eight Syriac Orthodox patriarchs sat during this period, and in many cases Michael was able to list the names of the bishops consecrated during their reigns, their monasteries of origin, and the place where they were consecrated.

Two twelfth-century bishops omitted from Michael's list are mentioned in the Chronicon Ecclesiasticum of the Jacobite maphrian Bar Hebraeus (ob.1286).

Location 
Simandu was a district near Melitene, known in Greek as Tzamendos.  During the twelfth century  it was included in the territories of the Frankish County of Edessa.

Bishops and metropolitans of Simandu 
Eleven Jacobite metropolitans of Simandu are mentioned in the lists of Michael the Syrian.

Two twelfth-century bishops of Simandu omitted from the lists of Michael the Syrian are mentioned in the Chronicon Ecclesiasticum of Bar Hebraeus:

Yohannan, previously bishop of Segestan, was awarded the diocese of Simandu at the synod of Kaishum in 1129, at the request of the Frankish count Joscelin I of Edessa.
Bar Turkaya, bishop of Tel Bshir, was transferred to Simandu in or shortly after 1132, and after a short residence as bishop of Simandu was again transferred to Habora.

The diocese of Simandu seems to have lapsed around the end of the twelfth century, perhaps after the death of the bishop Basil (1139/1166).

Notes

References 
 
 
 Jean-Baptiste Chabot, Chronique de Michel le Syrien, Patriarche Jacobite d'Antiche (1166-1199). Éditée pour la première fois et traduite en francais I-IV (1899;1901;1905;1910; a supplement to volume I containing an introduction to Michael and his work, corrections, and an index, was published in 1924. Reprinted in four volumes 1963, 2010).

Syriac Orthodox dioceses